Teep or teeps may refer to:

Teep kick or front kick, in martial arts
Teeps, fictional characters with telepathic powers in "The Hood Maker" by Philip K. Dick
TEEPS, an electric smoking system
Technically, Environmentally and Economically Practicable, a waste management acronym
Tom Parsons (cricketer) (born 1987), known as Teeps
Total effective equipment performance (TEEP), a measure of overall equipment effectiveness

See also
Telepathy
Tipi, also teepee, is a cone-shaped tent